The Wye Mill is the oldest continuously operated grist mill in the United States, located at Wye Mills, Queen Anne's County and Talbot County, Maryland, United States. It is the earliest industrial site on the Eastern Shore in continuous use; dating to the late 17th century. It is a wood-frame, water-powered grist mill, with a 19th-century 26 HP  Fitz steel overshot wheel. The mill retains nearly all of its late-18th-century equipment. The Wye Mill was one of the first grist mills to be automated with the Oliver Evans process, which is still in use today.

The Wye Mill was listed on the National Register of Historic Places in 1985.

References

External links
 Wye Grist Mill - official site
 , including undated photo, at Maryland Historical Trust

Grinding mills in Maryland
Buildings and structures in Queen Anne's County, Maryland
Buildings and structures in Talbot County, Maryland
Mill museums in Maryland
Museums in Queen Anne's County, Maryland
Museums in Talbot County, Maryland
National Register of Historic Places in Queen Anne's County, Maryland
Grinding mills on the National Register of Historic Places in Maryland